The Best Film with Popular Appeal and Aesthetic Value is an award, begun in 1976, presented annually at the Kerala State Film Awards of India to the best film with popular appeal and aesthetic value in Malayalam film industry. Until 1997, the awards were managed directly by the Department of Cultural Affairs of the Government of Kerala. Since 1998, the awards have been controlled by the Kerala State Chalachitra Academy, an autonomous, non-profit institution functioning under the Department of Cultural Affairs. The winner, producer and director, receives a certificate, statuette and a cash prize of ₹100,000 each.

Superlatives
Four wins: Antony Perumbavoor (producer)
Four wins: Fazil (director, producer)
Four wins:  Ranjith (2 as director & 2 as producer)
Three wins: Sathyan Anthikkad (director)
Three wins: P. V. Gangadharan (producer)

Winners

References

External links
Official website
PRD, Govt. of Kerala: Awardees List

Kerala State Film Awards